The United Defense M42, sometimes known as the Marlin for the company that did the actual manufacturing, was an American submachine gun used during World War II. It was produced from 1942 to 1943 by United Defense Supply Corp. for possible issue as a replacement for the Thompson submachine gun and was used by agents of the Office of Strategic Services (OSS). However, its usage was limited, and the Thompson continued to see service until the end of the war, alongside the M3 submachine gun, which was designed around the same time as the M42.

History

The M42 submachine gun was designed by Carl G. Swebilius of the High Standard Manufacturing Company in 1940. When High Standard was tasked with producing .50 Browning machine guns for the British government, further development of the submachine gun was handled the United Defense Supply Corporation founded by Pope and Jackson of the British Purchasing Commission. United Defense did not have any manufacturing capability so it contracted with Marlin Firearms to have the M42 actually built.

The UD M42 was promoted as a replacement for the Thompson submachine gun, which the U.S. military considered both expensive and complicated to produce. Early model Thompson drum magazines were heavy and made a rattling sound when soldiers moved around with the weapon. Made in both 9×19mm Parabellum and .45 ACP prototypes, the 9 mm version was the only one to ever see widespread production. About 15,000 were produced in the last three years of World War II. Only six .45 ACP prototype test guns were made.

The weapon holds 25 9mm rounds in its magazine (designed by John E. Owsley, covered by patent 2,289,067). It has a cyclic rate of 700 rounds per minute. Frequently two 25-round magazines were welded face-to-face allowing a quick reload when the first became empty. However, just like using the Sten, resistance fighters were instructed to fire in short bursts when firing in full automatic to reduce the risk of overworking the weapon that would cause jamming and overall keeping it in a good condition. They were also strongly advised to keep the double magazine clear of grass, mud, dirt and any other debris out because of the risk of jamming.

An extremely simple design, it was a straight blowback, selective fire weapon. It was built under "hurry-up" war conditions and some of its design flaws stem from this approach. Problems with the weapon were varied. Under combat conditions it was found that the sheet metal magazines had a tendency to warp out of shape causing feeding problems. They had little tolerance for exposure to large amounts of mud and sand and tended to jam if not cleaned regularly. The gun was also labor-intensive to produce. It used all machined parts, no stampings, and under wartime conditions, machine work is at a premium. However, proving ground tests showed it was easier to field strip and maintain than the Thompson or Sten Mark II and was more accurate at 100 yards. Despite its expense and precision, the UD M42 enjoyed a good reputation in OSS and resistance usage.

The War Department was interested in purchasing large quantities of the M42, but due to complicated legal issues, manufacturing rights, and royalties, only 15,000 units were purchased. The M42 submachine gun was classified as a substitute standard when the M3 submachine gun was introduced. It is often stated that it used 20-round magazines, which were used in .45-caliber prototypes, but only 25-round magazines were used in the 9mm production version.

Operational use
Intended for use by U.S. troops at the time of its design, it found more favor being air-dropped to partisan forces in occupied Europe. The weapon was air dropped to supply British-led partisan forces on the island of Crete, where it was used extensively. It also saw use among the partisan forces of the Italian, Belgian, Dutch, Danish, Norwegian and French Resistance. At least 4,000 sent to United States Navy installations in the Far East were transferred to Dai Li's regular resistance forces in China for use against the Japanese invasion; and some later equipped Communist Chinese soldiers. The United Defense M42 was issued for use by Filipino troops under the Philippine Army and Philippine Constabulary during World War II from 1942 through the Post-World War II era until the 1960s and was used by the local recognized guerrillas from 1942 to 1945 during the Japanese Occupation. In Europe, the use of the 9 mm caliber allowed resistance forces to use captured German ammunition in their weapons, eliminating the need for repeated re-supply drops.

Overall the weapon failed in its intended role (to replace the Thompson) but proved effective in limited use in the hands of resistance forces.

Users

: 100 pieces from US supplies used by insurgent army and partisans during Slovak National Uprising
: Supplied to the French Forces of the Interior.
Vichy France: Small number of captured examples issued to Milice française
: Supplied to the Belgian Resistance during WW2.
: Supplied to Italian partisans during the Italian Campaign of WW2
: Supplied to the Dutch resistance during WW2.
: Used by the Philippine Army and Constabulary during World War II and Post War era from 1942 to 1960s and used again by the local recognized guerrillas from 1942 to 1945 during World War II.

 Yugoslav Partisans: Supplied by the OSS.
  Provisional Irish Republican Army: Supplied to the IRA by Greek Cypriot group EOKA.

See also
List of individual weapons of the U.S. Armed Forces

Bibliography
Nelson, Thomas B. (1963). The World's Submachine Guns, Volume I. International Small Arms Publishers.
Iannamico, Frank. (2004). United States Submachine Guns: From the American 180 to the ZX-7. Moose Lake Publishing. .
Brophy, William S. (1989). Marlin Firearms: A History of the Guns and the Company That Made Them. Stackpole Books.

References

External links
Modern Firearms: United Defense UD M42 submachine gun
Springfield Armory Collection: UD M42, 9MM
Springfield Armory Collection: UD M42, .45 ACP
magazine patent
submachine gun patent
American Rifleman article
Small Arms Review article

Insurgency weapons
World War II submachine guns
Submachine guns of the United States
World War II infantry weapons of the United States
9mm Parabellum submachine guns
Weapons of the Philippine Army
Weapons and ammunition introduced in 1942